Spiranthes porrifolia is a species of orchid known by the common names creamy lady's tresses and western ladies' tresses. It is native to the western United States from Washington and Idaho to southern California. It can be found in moist habitats, such as mountain meadows, swamps, fens, and riverbanks. The leaves are mainly located around the base of the erect stem. They are linear or lance-shaped, or sometimes nearly oval. The top of the stem is occupied by the inflorescence, a dense spiral of many flowers. Each flower is somewhat tubular, with an upper and lower lip, and cream to yellowish in color.

The specific epithet porrifolia is Latin for "leek-leaved".

References

External links 
 Jepson Manual Treatment of Spiranthes porrifolia
 Washington Burke Museum
 Spiranthes porrifolia — UC Photo gallery

porrifolia
Endemic orchids of the United States
Orchids of California
Flora of the Northwestern United States
Flora of Idaho
Flora of Washington (state)
Flora of the Cascade Range
Flora of the Klamath Mountains
Flora of the Sierra Nevada (United States)
Natural history of the California Coast Ranges
Natural history of the Peninsular Ranges
Natural history of the Transverse Ranges
Flora without expected TNC conservation status